Cristian Raileanu (born 24 January 1993) is a Moldovan-born Romanian cyclist, who most recently rode for UCI Continental team . He represented Moldova until 2022.

Major results
Source: 

2012
 8th Giro del Belvedere
2013
 3rd Time trial, Moldovan National Under-23 Road Championships
2014
 Moldovan National Road Championships
2nd Time trial
3rd Road race
 5th Trofeo Città di San Vendemiano
 9th GP Bianco di Custoza
2015
 Moldovan National Road Championships
1st  Under-23 road race
2nd Road race
3rd Time trial
 3rd Ruota d'Oro
 9th Trofeo Internazionale Bastianelli
2016
 1st  Road race, Moldovan National Road Championships
 7th Giro del Medio Brenta
2017
 3rd Road race, Moldovan National Road Championships
 4th Overall Tour of Bihor-Bellotto
 4th Overall Tour of Szeklerland
1st Stage 3a (ITT)
 4th Antwerpse Havenpijl
 6th Overall Sibiu Cycling Tour
 7th Overall Tour de Hongrie
 8th Tour du Jura
2018
 1st Overall Tour of Cartier
1st Stage 2
 1st Mountains classification, Tour of Romania
 2nd Overall Tour of Antalya
 2nd Overall Tour of Mesopotamia
 3rd Road race, Moldovan National Road Championships
 3rd Overall Tour de Serbie
 4th Grand Prix Side
 5th Overall Tour of Bihor-Bellotto
 7th Overall Tour of Mevlana
 8th Grand Prix Alanya
 9th Overall Tour of Mersin
2019
 Moldovan National Road Championships
1st  Time trial
1st  Road race
 1st Stage 4 Tour of Taiyuan
 2nd Overall Tour of Iran (Azerbaijan)
 2nd Overall Tour de Singkarak
1st Stage 4
 3rd Overall Tour de Iskandar Johor
1st Stage 2
 4th Overall Tour of Peninsular
1st Stage 5
 5th Overall Tour de Indonesia
 10th Overall Tour de Taiwan
2020
 Moldovan National Road Championships
1st  Time trial
1st  Road race
 1st  Cross-country, Moldovan National Mountain Bike Championships
 5th Malaysian International Classic Race
 7th Overall Tour de Langkawi
2021
 Moldovan National Road Championships
1st  Time trial
2nd Road race
 1st  Cross-country, Moldovan National Mountain Bike Championships
2022
 2nd Overall Tour of Romania
 2nd Overall Tour of Albania
 Romanian National Road Championships
3rd Time trial
5th Road race
 8th Overall Tour of Szeklerland
1st Stage 4
 9th Overall Tour of Sharjah

References

External links

1993 births
Living people
Moldovan male cyclists
Romanian male cyclists
Cyclists at the 2015 European Games
European Games competitors for Moldova
Cyclists at the 2019 European Games
Sportspeople from Bălți